Slavica may refer to:

People
 Slavica Ćukteraš (born 1985), Serbian singer
 Slavica Đukić (born 1960), Serbian handball player
 Slavica Ecclestone (born 1958), Croatian fashion model
 Slavica Jeremić (born 1957), Serbian handball player

Other
 
 Slavica (film), a 1947 Yugoslav drama film

See also
 Slava (given name)
 

Croatian feminine given names
Serbian feminine given names